The 2013 Lethbridge municipal election was held Monday, October 21, 2013 to elect a mayor and eight councillors (at-large), the seven Lethbridge School District No. 51 trustees, and five of the Holy Spirit Roman Catholic Separate Regional Division No. 4’s nine trustees (as Ward 2). This election marks a change of title for council members, from "Alderman", to "Councillor".

From 1968 to 2013, provincial legislation has required every municipality to hold elections every three years. The Legislative Assembly of Alberta passed a bill on December 5, 2012, amending the Local Authorities Election Act. Starting with the 2013 elections, officials are elected for a four-year term, and municipal elections are moved to a four-year cycle. Of the 72,912 eligible voters, only 21,726 turned in a ballot, a voter turnout of 29.8%, and an average of 5.66 councillors per ballot.

Results
Bold indicates elected, and incumbents are italicized.

Mayor

Councillors

Public School Trustees

Separate School Trustees

References

2013
2013 Alberta municipal elections